Liptena eukrinaria, the untidy liptena, is a butterfly in the family Lycaenidae. It is found in Nigeria (east and the Cross River loop) and western Cameroon. The habitat probably consists of drier forests.

References

Butterflies described in 1926
Liptena